David Anthony Faustino (born March 3, 1974) is an American actor and radio personality primarily known for his role as Bud Bundy on the Fox sitcom Married... with Children. He has also voiced animated characters for Nickelodeon, including Mako on The Legend of Korra and Helia on Nickelodeon's revival of Winx Club.

Early life
Faustino was born in Los Angeles, California, on March 3, 1974, to Roger Faustino, a costumer, and Kay Faustino (née Freeman), a homemaker. His younger brother Michael made many guest appearances on Married... with Children, including the episode David co-wrote, "T*R*A*S*H".

Career

Acting

Faustino made his television debut at the age of three months, when he appeared on the Lily Tomlin Special. He did not start acting regularly until 1980, after a small role on Little House on the Prairie. Throughout the early to mid-1980s, Faustino guest-starred on a number of TV shows such as Highway to Heaven,  Family Ties, St. Elsewhere, and The Love Boat.

In 1986 and 1987, David played the older of two young sons in Disney movies Mr. Boogedy and Bride of Boogedy.

In 1987, he landed a full-time gig on Married... with Children, which was his big break. He played Bud, the younger of the two Bundy children, in 259 episodes, from April 5, 1987, until the season finale on June 9, 1997. He reprised the role of Bud Bundy in such series as Parker Lewis Can't Lose and Top of the Heap. Faustino also appeared on Burke's Law, MADtv, and The New Addams Family.

In 2001, Faustino appeared in the independent film Killer Bud, produced by Aglet Productions. The following year, he appeared in the reality television special Celebrity Boot Camp (a shortened version of the Boot Camp series for celebrities). In 2005 Faustino guest-starred on two episodes of One on One.

In 2007-09, Faustino developed and starred in Star-ving, a weekly Internet comedy series on Crackle, an online video network backed by Sony Pictures Entertainment. A total of 12 episodes of Star-ving were produced. Faustino played an exaggerated version of himself in the series, which he wrote and developed with several friends as an "anti-Entourage." "This is a very twisted take on what I've been through all these years," Faustino said. He also starred as Jason Dockery in the 2008 movie RoboDoc.

Faustino appeared with the cast of Married... with Children again at the 7th Annual TV Land Awards in 2009, presented by Dr. Phil. He also had cameo appearances in two episodes of the HBO series Entourage.

Faustino co-starred in the feature Not Another B Movie which was distributed by Troma Entertainment in 2011. The same year, he was cast in Nickelodeon's revival of Winx Club as the voice of Helia. By the next year, Nickelodeon cast him again in the sequel series The Legend of Korra as the voice of firebender Mako, a central character named after the late Mako Iwamatsu (the voice of Iroh in the first two seasons of the original series Avatar: The Last Airbender). He also voiced Dagur the Deranged as a secondary villain on season one and main villain in season 2 of DreamWorks Dragons, and Later,  redeemed character in Race to the Edge.

In 2017, Faustino appeared in the Bones 12th-season episode "The Radioactive Panthers in the Party," playing a fictional version of himself as a suspect in the death of an aspiring filmmaker.

Music
In 1992 Faustino was featured on the album Balistyx, which spawned one single titled "I Told Ya."

Personal life
Faustino co-founded and co-hosted a nightclub in Los Angeles named Balistyx, which is the same name as his rap album. The club was "the first hip-hop/funk club on the Sunset Strip," and was originally held on Thursday nights at the Whisky a Go Go in 1991. The club closed after a final New Year's Eve party at The Roxy in 1993.

After meeting at a spiritual center in Los Angeles and dating for five years, he married Andrea Elmer on January 24, 2004, at the Little White Wedding Chapel in Las Vegas, Nevada. They separated in May 2006. Faustino sought not to pay spousal support, according to the papers filed in Los Angeles. On February 6, 2007, Faustino officially filed for divorce in Los Angeles County Superior Court, citing irreconcilable differences.

Faustino was arrested for misdemeanor possession of marijuana in Florida in May 2007. A disorderly intoxication charge was later dropped after Faustino agreed to enroll in a drug rehabilitation facility.

On November 14, 2015, his girlfriend Lindsay Bronson gave birth to their daughter.

Filmography

Film

Television

Music videos

References

External links

 

1974 births
Living people
20th-century American male actors
21st-century American male actors
21st-century American male musicians
21st-century American rappers
American male child actors
American male rappers
American male television actors
American male voice actors
Male actors from Los Angeles
Rappers from Los Angeles